Mosolotshane is a village in Central District of Botswana. It is located 50 km east of Mahalapye and 20 km north-east of Shoshong. Mosolotshane has a primary school and a health clinic, and the population was 1,796 in 2001 census.

References

Populated places in Central District (Botswana)
Villages in Botswana